Kancheepuram district is one of the 38 districts in the state of Tamil Nadu in India. The area comprising the present day Kancheepuram district was earlier a part of Chingleput district. The original Chingleput district was split in 1997 into form the present day Kancheepuram and Tiruvallur districts.

On 18 July 2019, Chengalpattu district was carved out of Kanchipuram district, with suburbs from Chengalpet towards Chennai under the district headquarters in Chengalpet. The separation came into effect from 29 November which was done by Chief Minister Mr. Edappadi K Palaniswami.

Geography
Kancheepuram district is situated on the North Eastern part of Tamil Nadu. It is bounded by Chengalpattu district in the East, Chennai district in the northeast, Ranipet and Tiruvannamalai districts in the west and Thiruvallur district in the north. It lies between 11° 00' to 12° 00' latitudes and 77° 28' to 78° 50' longitudes.  The district has a total geographical area of 4,43,210 hectares.

The table below shows the maximum and minimum temperatures experienced in the district during different seasons.

Northeast and Southwest monsoon are the major donors, with 54% and 36% contribution each to the total annual rainfall. During normal monsoon, the district receives a rainfall of 1200 mm.

The Palar river is the most important river running through the district. Through most of the year it remains dry, attributed to the construction of dams across the river in Andhra Pradesh. There are only a few hills of considerable elevation in the district. The southern part of Maduranthakam taluk contains small hills. The total forest area in the district is 23,586 hectares.

Climate

Administration structure 
The district has various levels of local bodies for administration purposes.
 Urban
 Corporation
Kancheepuram - district headquarters
 Municipality
Kunrathur
Mangadu
 Town Panchayat
Sriperumbudur
Uthiramerur
Walajabad
 Rural
 District panchayat wards - 9
 Panchayat union wards - 5
 Village panchayat wards - 274

Revenue divisions and taluks 
Kancheepuram District consists of two revenue divisions and five taluks:

 Sriperumbudur taluk
 Kundrathur taluk
 Kanchipuram taluk
 Walajabad taluk
 Uthiramerur taluk

Demographics

According to 2011 census, Kancheepuram district had a population of 3,998,252 with a sex-ratio of 986 females for every 1,000 males, much above the national average of 929. A total of 431,574 were under the age of six, constituting 220,341 males and 211,233 females. Scheduled Castes and Scheduled Tribes accounted for 23.71% and 1.03% of the population respectively. The average literacy of the district was 75.37%, compared to the national average of 72.99%. The district had a total of 1,006,245 households. There were a total of 1,673,814 workers, comprising 74,761 cultivators, 162,494 main agricultural labourers, 41,149 in house hold industries, 1,088,974 other workers, 306,436 marginal workers, 14,582 marginal cultivators, 110,020 marginal agricultural labourers, 13,583 marginal workers in household industries and 168,251 other marginal workers.

Politics 

|}

Economy

Agriculture is the main occupation of the people with 47% of the population engaged in it. Paddy is the major crop cultivated in this district. Groundnuts, sugarcane, cereals, millet and pulses are the other major crops cultivated. 76.50 metric tonnes lands are cultivated in fuel wood and 8.039 tonnes in cashew. Palar river along with tanks and wells are the main sources of irrigation in this district.

More than 70 percent of the 163 notified areas (megalithic sites) in the state of Tamil Nadu are in Kancheepuram district, including those at Erumaiyur, Nandampakkam, Sirukalathur, Sikarayapuram, Ayyancheri, Kilambakkam and Nanmangalam.

See also
 List of districts of Tamil Nadu
 Thenambakkam

References

External links

 Kanchipuram district website

 
Districts of Tamil Nadu
1997 establishments in Tamil Nadu